You Could Have Been with Me is the second studio album by the British-born singer Sheena Easton. It was released on 21 September 1981 by EMI.

Background
The album reached number 33 on the UK Albums Chart and has been certified silver by the British Phonographic Industry (BPI). In the United States, it peaked at number 47 on the Billboard 200 and was eventually certified gold by the Recording Industry Association of America (RIAA). The title track was the best-performing single from the album, reaching number 15 on the US Billboard Hot 100 and number 54 on the UK Singles Chart. In the United Kingdom, the lead single, "Just Another Broken Heart", peaked at number 33, while third single "A Little Tenderness" failed to chart in early 1982. In the US, a track from her first album was included, "When He Shines", which was released as a single and peaked at number 30.

You Could Have Been With Me became a top-10 album in Japan, following the use of the track "A Little Tenderness" in a television advertising campaign for Noevir Cosmetics. The album also reached number two in Sweden and number seven in Norway.

A CD reissue in 2000 added the track "For Your Eyes Only" (number four in the US and number eight in the UK), one of Easton's most successful singles.

On 23 February 2013, British record label Edsel Records reissued Easton's You Could Have Been with Me and Madness, Money & Music in two-disc packages remastered with bonus tracks.

On 24 November 2014, the album was included in an Original Album Series box set in the UK with all of her first five albums with EMI through Warner Music Group.

Track listing

US and Canadian edition
North American editions of the album replaced "Isn't It So" with "When He Shines", and switched the order of tracks 2 and 5 ("You Could Have Been with Me" and "Savoir Faire".)

Personnel 
Credits adapted from the liner notes of You Could Have Been with Me.

Musicians

 Sheena Easton – lead vocals
 Ian Lynn – keyboards, synthesizers ; string arrangements 
 Phil Palmer – guitars
 Andy Brown – bass
 Peter Van Hooke – drums
 Frank Ricotti – percussion
 Alan Carvell – backing vocals
 Christopher Neil – backing vocals
 Tony Rivers – backing vocals

Technical 
 Nick Ryan – engineering
 Greg Edward – engineering assistance
 Christopher Neil – production

Artwork 
 Brian Aris – photography
 Cream – sleeve design

Charts

Weekly charts

Year-end charts

Certifications

References

1982 albums
Albums produced by Christopher Neil
EMI Records albums
Sheena Easton albums